Suicide Kings is a 1997 American crime thriller black comedy film directed by Peter O'Fallon and starring Christopher Walken, Denis Leary, Sean Patrick Flanery, Johnny Galecki, Jay Mohr, Jeremy Sisto and Henry Thomas. Based on Don Stanford's short story The Hostage, the film follows the group of students who kidnap a respected Mafia figure. It has a 33% approval rating on Rotten Tomatoes and grossed $1.7 million in the US.

Plot
Charlie Barret walks to his private table in a restaurant, only to see two young men sitting at his table – Avery and Max. Another young man, who is friends with Avery and Max, Brett, joins them shortly after Charlie sits down and begins chatting with them. Charlie happens to know Avery's father, and, after an initial reluctance, is willing to go with the boys for a "night on the town".

Before meeting Charlie, they had previously planned to use chloroform to knock him out in their car. The plan goes awry, and Charlie fights back, almost wrecking the car before they can finally put him under. When Charlie wakes up, he sees himself surrounded by the three men, and a fourth friend, T. K., checks his vital signs. It is revealed that Charlie is Carlo Bartolucci, a former mob figure. The boys explain that Avery's sister, Elise, has been kidnapped, and that the kidnappers are demanding a $2 million ransom for her release. Unable to come up with the money on such short notice, they figure Charlie still has connections to get the money and set up an exchange. To ensure that Charlie knows how serious they are, Charlie is shown his cut-off finger, still wearing his signet ring, and is told that the same was done to Elise. As incentive for his cooperation, they explain that they will do to him everything that is done to Elise.

Charlie flies into a rage and threatens to kill them, though he eventually agrees to help. As Charlie requests continual alcoholic drinks and his blood does not properly clot, T. K., a medical student, explains that Charlie's alcoholism may cause him to die of blood loss if he is not taken to a hospital. Charlie contacts his lawyer, who in turn contacts Lono, Charlie's bodyguard, and asks him to track Charlie down. Lono goes about his own investigation, asking for - and in some cases beating out - information from people. However, he shows he has a soft side as one of the people he beats up is the father of Jennifer, the hostess at the restaurant that Charlie and the boys frequent. Meanwhile, Charlie seems to take perverse pleasure in playing mind games with his kidnappers. During the course of these conversations, Charlie unnerves the friends with stories of his early years as a gangster, especially concerning some former neighbors of his that he had had killed and then fed their remains to their Dobermans. Another story was how he got his signet ring.

Meanwhile Marty, Charlie's attorney, conducts his own investigation. He speaks to Lydia, a successful madam, whose life Charlie had saved, many years ago, from her former lover and pimp. The pimp wanted to kill her because she'd spent money on herself that he felt belonged to him. Lydia gives Marty a list of contacts.

As Lono searches for Charlie, Charlie takes advantage of the boys' naïvete. A fifth friend, Ira, shows up unexpectedly and demands an explanation. They tell him they are using his house under the cover story of a poker game. Ira is flustered by their carelessness in his parents' house and becomes even more worried when he realizes they have kidnapped a major figure in the mob. 

Charlie plays the friends against each other, slowly getting information out of them and using it to his advantage. After much cajoling and piecing information together, Charlie identifies Max, Elise's boyfriend, as an inside man and pressures him into saying he is sorry. As his enraged friends plan to cut off his finger, Avery stops them by admitting that it was actually his plan, and says he recruited Max to help him. Avery had made several unlucky bets, could not pay off his debts, and was approached by mobsters who had purchased his debt.  They offered him a way out: Become an inside man in his own sister's kidnapping.

Lono eventually makes his way to Ira's house and forces the young men to remove Charlie from his restraints.  Around the same time, the money is sent to the two thugs who are demanding the ransom and they agree that Elise will be dropped off at a nearby hospital. Lono and Charlie drive away and Avery rushes to meet his sister at the appointed drop-off, but she does not appear. Avery is devastated.

Charlie and Lono track down the two kidnappers and demand the money back.  Lono retrieves a suitcase from the bathroom that is supposed to have the $2 million in it.  When Charlie and Lono demand to know where "the girl" is, they insist that they never kidnapped Elise. Charlie and Lono think that the thugs are lying and shoot them booth dead. They then discover that Elise is indeed not being held with the thugs and Lono remarks that the suitcase doesn't feel heavy/full enough (implying that some cash may be missing). It is revealed that Max and Elise set the whole thing up, splitting the ransom between them and the thugs. Charlie and Lono track Max and Elise to a boat off a tropical island where, although Charlie understands their reasons for conning him and agrees with Max on how special Elise is, he has Lono shoot them both dead. The screen dissolves to a rotoscope red and the film ends with Charlie and Lono standing alone on the boat.

Cast
 Christopher Walken as Carlo Bartolucci / Charlie Barret
 Denis Leary as Lono Veccio
 Henry Thomas as Avery Chasten
 Sean Patrick Flanery as Max Minot
 Jay Mohr as Brett Campbell
 Jeremy Sisto as T.K.
 Frank Medrano as Heckle
 Brad Garrett as Jeckyll
 Johnny Galecki as Ira Reder
 Laura San Giacomo as Lydia
 Laura Harris as Elise Chasten
 Nina Siemaszko as Jennifer
 Cliff DeYoung as Marty

Production

Filming
Suicide Kings was shot in Los Angeles.

Alternate endings
The film also features two alternate endings. In one of them, Charlie allows Max and Elise to live, but reclaims the $1 million, giving them a small amount of the money back. In the other ending, Charlie allows them to live, but takes his money, after which Lono shoots holes in the boat, causing it to slowly sink. However, test audiences didn't like these endings as much, feeling that Max and Elise needed to pay for the betrayal of their friends and grief they had caused.

Reception
Rotten Tomatoes, a review aggregator, reports that 33% of 30 surveyed critics gave the film a positive review; the average rating is 5.3/10.  Joe Leydon of Variety wrote, "With a nod toward Quentin Tarantino and an appreciative wink at Lyle Kessler's Orphans, Suicide Kings is a smart and snappy drama tinged with dark humor and brimming with self-confidence." James Berardinelli of ReelViews wrote "while the narrative is a little too erratic to ascend to the Pulp Fiction level, the tone and style are on target. For those who aren't offended by extreme profanity and violence, Suicide Kings offers a kinetic and surprisingly funny two hours." David Luty of Film Journal International called it "a convoluted, senseless mess" that borrows too much from Tarantino.  Stephen Holden of The New York Times wrote that the film will entertain those unconcerned about plot holes or credibility.  Kevin Thomas of the Los Angeles Times called it "a smart B-picture with lots of A-pluses".  Owen Gleiberman of Entertainment Weekly rated it C− and called it "another imitation of early Quentin Tarantino", as did Siskel & Ebert on their show.

References

External links
 
 
 
 

1997 films
1990s black comedy films
1997 crime thriller films
1997 independent films
1990s mystery thriller films
American black comedy films
American crime thriller films
American independent films
American mystery thriller films
American neo-noir films
American nonlinear narrative films
Artisan Entertainment films
Films about kidnapping
Films about friendship
Films about murderers
Films scored by Graeme Revell
1997 directorial debut films
1990s English-language films
1990s American films